Tarbana, or Tarbanes (Ταρβανῆς), was a town of ancient Caria. Tarbana appears in the Athenian tribute lists and paid an annual tribute of 17 drachmae, 1 obol. The town was possibly the same as Trybanes (Τρυβανῆς).
 
Its site is unlocated.

References

Populated places in ancient Caria
Former populated places in Turkey
Lost ancient cities and towns
Members of the Delian League